Filizzola is an Italian surname. Notable people with the surname include:

Carlos Filizzola (born 1959), Paraguayan politician
Maximiliano Filizzola (born 1996), Argentine rugby union player
Rafael Filizzola (born 1968), Paraguayan politician

Italian-language surnames